Armond Rizzo (born July 19, 1990), previously Joey Rodriguez, is an American pornographic actor.

After serving in the United States Navy on USS George H.W. Bush, Rizzo had plans to become an actor, but instead decided to start performing in porn after meeting fellow pornographic actor Shane Frost. Over the course of his career, he has won several awards, including two GayVN Awards and one Grabby Award, and has consistently been one of the most searched-for gay porn stars on Pornhub.

Early life
Rizzo was born on July 19, 1990 in Aurora, Illinois to Mexican parents. Growing up, he practiced aikido for five years, while participating in theater at his high school. During his youth, he also attended modeling school. After graduating from high school, Rizzo enlisted in the United States Navy, where he served on USS George H.W. Bush for four years. After leaving the military, he attended culinary school, but eventually dropped out.

Career
Rizzo originally had hopes of being an actor, but worried he would not be tall enough to get roles. He decided to start performing in porn after meeting former pornographic actor Shane Frost through gay social networking and online dating application Jack'd. In 2013, he appeared in his first pornographic scene with studio Randy Blue, for which he only shot one scene. Though he planned on quitting after the scene, he came into contact with fellow porn actor Bruno Bond, who encouraged him to apply for Raging Stallion. After applying, he appeared in a scene with Landon Conrad for the studio, which was followed by scenes with Falcon Studios and Breeditraw.com. His earliest scenes involving bareback sex were performed under the name Joey Rodriguez, while those performed using a condom were made under the name Armond Rizzo. In 2017, he was nominated for a GayVN Award for Best Ethnic Scene, but turned down the nomination.

In 2019, Rizzo appeared in the pornographic film Big Black Daddy with Max Konnor for Noir Male, for which he won the GayVN Award for Best Duo Sex Scene (making Rizzo and Konnor the first actors of color to win the award) and earned a nomination for the Grabby Award for Best Duo. That same year, he won the Grabby Award for Hottest Bottom. In 2018, Rizzo was the second-most searched-for gay porn actor on Pornhub, becoming the third-most searched in 2018. After being asked to work with studio BlacksOnBoys in January 2020, Rizzo declined, later revealing via Twitter that the studio paid performers who bottomed significantly less than performers who topped, and that the studio originally offered him between $400 and $500. The instance led to Rizzo demanding equal pay for tops and bottoms in the industry.

As of 2019, Rizzo has never been exclusive to any single agency.

Public image
Rizzo has been renowned for his consistent appearances as a bottom in his pornographic films. Adult Video News called Rizzo "the best bottom in the business" in 2019. Pedestrian TV referred to Rizzo as "one of the most renowned bottoms in the land". CromosomaX included him on their list of the 10 pornstars with the best ass.

Awards

References

1990 births
Living people
Gay pornographic film actors
People from Aurora, Illinois
21st-century LGBT people
American male actors of Mexican descent